Shakuntala Devi  (10 October 1931 – 9 January 2022) was an Indian politician.

Biography
She was a Member of Parliament, representing Banka, Bihar in the Lok Sabha the lower house of India's Parliament as a member of the  Indian National Congress. Devi died in Patna on 9 January 2022, at the age of 90.

References

External links
Official biographical sketch in Parliament of India website

1931 births
2022 deaths
India MPs 1957–1962
India MPs 1962–1967
Indian National Congress politicians from Bihar
Lok Sabha members from Bihar